Geraldine Pillay (born 25 August 1977) is a South African sprinter who specializes in the 100 and 200 metres.

Achievements 
2008 African Championships - sixth place (100 metres), fourth place (200 metres), bronze medal (4x100 metres relay)
2006 African Championships - silver medal (200 metres)
2006 Commonwealth Games - silver medal (100 metres), bronze medal (200 metres)
2004 African Championships - bronze medal (100 metres), gold medal (200 metres)

Personal bests
60 metres – 7.38 s (2002)
100 metres – 11.07 s (2005)
200 metres – 22.78 s (2005)

External links

1977 births
Living people
South African female sprinters
Athletes (track and field) at the 2004 Summer Olympics
Olympic athletes of South Africa
Athletes (track and field) at the 2006 Commonwealth Games
Commonwealth Games silver medallists for South Africa
Commonwealth Games bronze medallists for South Africa
Commonwealth Games medallists in athletics
African Games silver medalists for South Africa
African Games medalists in athletics (track and field)
Athletes (track and field) at the 2003 All-Africa Games
Olympic female sprinters
20th-century South African women
21st-century South African women
Medallists at the 2006 Commonwealth Games